The 2000 Tour de France was a multiple stage bicycle race held from 1 to 23 July, and the 87th edition of the Tour de France. It has no overall winner—although American cyclist Lance Armstrong originally won the event, the United States Anti-Doping Agency announced on 24 August 2012 that they had disqualified Armstrong from all his results since 1 August 1998, including his seven Tour de France wins from 1999 to 2005; the Union Cycliste Internationale confirmed the result.

The Tour started with an individual time trial in Futuroscope (not an official prologue because it was longer than 8 km) and ended, traditionally, in Paris. The distance travelled was 3663 km (counter-clockwise around France). The Tour passed through Switzerland and Germany.

Before the race started, there were several favourites: Armstrong, after his 1999 Tour de France victory; Jan Ullrich, having won the 1997 Tour de France, finishing second in the 1996 and 1998 tours, and not entering the 1999 Tour due to an injury; and 1998 Tour winner Marco Pantani. Richard Virenque finished 8th place in the 1999 Tour despite bad preparation, and for the 2000 edition he was considered an important rider. Fernando Escartín, Bobby Julich, Alexander Vinokourov and Alex Zülle were also considered contenders.

Teams

17 teams were automatically selected based on their UCI rankings. In addition, three teams were given wildcards by organisers of the Tour, Amaury Sport Organisation (ASO). Each of these 20 teams sent 9 cyclists, for a total of 180: Before the start, each rider had to do a health check. The race thus started with 177 cyclists.

The teams entering the race were:

Qualified teams

Invited teams

Route and stages

Race overview

The first stage was won by British cyclist David Millar, with Lance Armstrong only 2 seconds behind in second place. Of the other pre-race favourites, Laurent Jalabert, Jan Ullrich and Alex Zülle all lost less than 20 seconds. Virenque, Vinokourov and Escartin lost around 1:30 on Armstrong, while Marco Pantani lost more than 2 minutes. The next two stages were sprinter stages, both won by Tom Steels, not changing much in the overall classification. Stage 4, a team time trial, was won by the ONCE cycling team, and after that stage the top 10 included 8 ONCE cyclists, including leader Laurent Jalabert.

In stage 6, 12 cyclists broke away and kept a 7:49-minute lead, which shook up the classification. Alberto Elli, one of the escapees, took over the yellow jersey.

In stage 10, the Tour entered the mountains. The stage, which finished at Hautacam, was won by Spaniard Javier Otxoa, but Lance Armstrong finished second and took the yellow jersey, with Ullrich in second place, more than 4 minutes behind. The 12th stage, finishing on Mont Ventoux, was won by Marco Pantani, but Lance Armstrong finished second with the same time, so Armstrong increased his lead. Stage 15 was also won by Pantani, but again Armstrong gained time on second-place Ullrich, who was 7:26 behind. On the 16th stage, Armstrong had a bad day and lost time. Ullrich's gap shrunk to 5:37.

On stage 17, Erik Dekker won his third stage of the Tour. Stage 19, an individual time trial, was the last chance to change the general classification, although it was very unlikely that time trial specialist Armstrong would lose his 5:37 lead. Armstrong eventually went on to win the stage, and secured his Tour win. He maintained his lead in the final two stages.

Doping

Subsequent to Armstrong's statement to withdraw his fight against United States Anti-Doping Agency's (USADA) charges, on 24 August 2012, the USADA said it would ban Armstrong for life and stripped him of his record seven Tour de France titles. Later that day it was confirmed in a USADA statement that Armstrong was banned for life and would be disqualified from any and all competitive results obtained on and subsequent to 1 August 1998, including forfeiture of any medals, titles, winnings, finishes, points and prizes. On 22 October 2012, the Union Cycliste Internationale endorsed the USADA sanctions, and decided not to award victories to any other rider or upgrade other placings in any of the affected events.

Classification leadership and minor prizes

There were several classifications in the 2000 Tour de France. The most important was the general classification, calculated by adding each cyclist's finishing times on each stage. The cyclist with the least accumulated time was the race leader, identified by the yellow jersey; the winner of this classification is considered the winner of the Tour.

Additionally, there was a points classification, which awarded a green jersey. In the points classification, cyclists got points for finishing among the best in a stage finish, or in intermediate sprints. The cyclist with the most points lead the classification, and was identified with a green jersey.

There was also a mountains classification. The organisation had categorised some climbs as either hors catégorie, first, second, third, or fourth-category; points for this classification were won by the first cyclists that reached the top of these climbs first, with more points available for the higher-categorised climbs. The cyclist with the most points lead the classification, and wore a white jersey with red polka dots.

The fourth individual classification was the young rider classification. This was decided the same way as the general classification, but only riders under 26 years were eligible. Up until 1989 the leader received a white jersey. After 1989 the white jersey was no longer awarded, but the classification was still held. In 2000 the race organisers decided to start awarding the white jersey.

For the team classification, the times of the best three cyclists per team on each stage were added; the leading team was the team with the lowest total time.

In addition, there was a combativity award given after each mass-start stage to the cyclist considered most combative, who wore a red number bib the next stage. The decision was made by a jury composed of journalists who gave points. The cyclist with the most points from votes in all stages led the combativity classification. Erik Dekker won this classification, and was given overall the super-combativity award. The Souvenir Henri Desgrange was given in honour of Tour founder Henri Desgrange to the first rider to pass the summit of the Col du Galibier. This prize was won by Pascal Hervé during stage 15. There was also a Souvenir in honour of Gino Bartali, winner of the 1938 and 1948 Tours, given first rider atop the Col d'Izoard on stage 14. This award was won by Santiago Botero.

In stage 2, Lance Armstrong wore the green jersey.
In stages 2 through 4, David Cañada wore the white jersey.

Final standings

General classification

Points classification

Mountains classification

Young rider classification

Team classification

Combativity classification

See also
 List of doping cases in cycling

Notes

References

Bibliography

External links

 
 2000 Tour de France at Cyclingnews.com

 
Tour de France by year
Tour de France
Tour de France